Robert Hunter Nugen (July 16, 1809 – February 28, 1872) was an American politician who served as a U.S. Representative from Ohio from 1861 to 1863, during the American Civil War.

Biography 
Born near Hallidays Cove, Washington County, Pennsylvania, Nugen moved to Ohio in 1811 with his parents, who settled in Columbiana County, Ohio. He received a limited education. He moved to Tuscarawas County in 1828 and engaged in agricultural pursuits, as well as being a contractor for some time. He held several local political offices and was delegate to the Democratic National Convention at Charleston in 1860.

Congress 
Nugen was elected as a Democrat to the Thirty-seventh Congress (March 4, 1861 - March 3, 1863).

Death
Retiring from politics, Nugen was the superintendent of the Ohio Canal until his death in Newcomerstown, Ohio, on February 28, 1872. He was interred in Newcomerstown Cemetery.

References
 Retrieved on 2009-5-11

1809 births
1872 deaths
People from Washington County, Pennsylvania
People from Tuscarawas County, Ohio
People of Ohio in the American Civil War
19th-century American politicians
Democratic Party members of the United States House of Representatives from Ohio